Rence van der Wal (born May 2, 1989, in Ede, Gelderland) is a Dutch footballer, who played as a striker at the first division club Go Ahead Eagles from Deventer.

Van der Wal made his debut for Go Ahead Eagles on January 13, 2006. He once was wanted by many Eredivisie clubs but he decided to stay with Go Ahead Eagles. His decision was based on a talk he had with Marc Overmars who also began his career there. Now he plays for DTS'35 Ede.

As of the 2009–2010 season, Rence van der Wal will be playing for Dutch top first division club SC Cambuur.

External links
 Profile

1989 births
Living people
People from Ede, Netherlands
Footballers from Gelderland
Dutch footballers
Go Ahead Eagles players
SC Cambuur players
TOP Oss players
Eerste Divisie players
Association football forwards